Inscription of Župa Dubrovačka is a Glagolitic inscription dated to the 11th century.

The inscription was found in 2007 during an archeological excavation of graves
close to the Church of Saint George located between the villages of Petrača and Buići in Župa Dubrovačka, Croatia.

It is the second largest Paleo-Slavic inscription from the earliest Glagolitic period, between the 10th and 12th century, the Baška tablet being the largest.

The inscription

The inscription totals 102 characters. The first 60-character part is written by Ivan, and in the second part Stjepan invokes St. Sophia and St. Sylvester. It reflects a vowel system composed of seven sounds: /a/, /e/, /i/, /u/, /o/, /ъ/, /ě/, and according to morphological and paleographic characteristics the inscription can be dated to the 11th century.

Notes

References

External links 
Croatian Glagolitic Script
Archaeological sites near Dubrovnik with several important discoveries

11th century in Croatia
Croatian culture
Old Croatian inscriptions
Croatian glagolithic texts